Stanley Fuller (13 October 1907 – 3 January 1988) was a British sprinter. He competed in the men's 100 metres at the 1932 Summer Olympics.

References

1907 births
1988 deaths
Athletes (track and field) at the 1932 Summer Olympics
British male sprinters
Olympic athletes of Great Britain
Sportspeople from Norwich